The 2021 Turkish Indoor Athletics Championships was the tenth edition of Turkey's national championship in indoor athletics. It was held from 5–7 February in Istanbul at the Ataköy Athletics Arena.

In the men's pole vault, Ersu Şaşma set a Turkish indoor record of 5.72 m.

Results

Men

Women

References

Results
 Turkish Ind. Ch. Ataköy Arena, Istanbul (TUR) 05–07 FEB 2021. World Athletics. Retrieved 2021-04-02.

External links
Official website for the Turkish Athletics Federation

Turkish Indoor Athletics Championships
Turkish Indoor Athletics Championships
Turkish Indoor Athletics Championships
Turkish Indoor Athletics Championships
Sports competitions in Istanbul